Xenia Knoll and Petra Martić were the defending champions, but Martić chose not to participate. Knoll played alongside Maryna Zanevska, but they lost to Maria Sakkari and Sara Sorribes Tormo in the quarterfinals.

Chuang Chia-jung and Renata Voráčová won the title, defeating Lina Gjorcheska and Aleksandrina Naydenova in the final, 6–4, 6–2.

Seeds

Draw

External Links
 Draw

Bol Open - Doubles
Croatian Bol Ladies Open